The 1988 Southwest Conference baseball tournament was the league's annual postseason tournament used to determine the Southwest Conference's (SWC) automatic bid to the 1988 NCAA Division I baseball tournament. The tournament was held from May 19 through 22 at George Cole Field on the campus of The University of Arkansas in Fayetteville, AR.

The number 1 seed  went 4–1 to win the team's 8th SWC tournament under head coach Cliff Gustafson.

Format and seeding 
The tournament featured the top four finishers of the SWC's 8 teams in a double-elimination tournament.

Tournament

References 

Tournament
Southwest Conference Baseball Tournament
Southwest Conference baseball tournament